Sarayköy can refer to:

 Sarayköy, a town in Turkey
 Sarayköy, Bayat
 Sarayköy, Eldivan
 Sarayköy, Kızılcahamam, a village
 Sarayköy, Yeniçağa, a village